The Nebraska Cornhuskers baseball team competes as part of NCAA Division I, representing the University of Nebraska–Lincoln in the Big Ten Conference. Nebraska plays its home games at Hawks Field at Haymarket Park, built in 2001 to replace the aging Buck Beltzer Stadium. The program began intercollegiate play in 1889 and has been coached by Will Bolt since 2020.

Nebraska's baseball program was disjointed in its first decades, frequently disbanding for years at a time. The hiring of Tony Sharpe in 1947 brought stability to the program, but success was limited. Sharpe and his successor John Sanders combined to lead NU for fifty-one seasons, making just three NCAA Tournament appearances between them. Nebraska hired Dave Van Horn in 1998 and he quickly turned the Huskers into a national power, making the program's first two College World Series appearances in 2001 and 2002. Mike Anderson took over for Van Horn and in 2005 led NU to its most successful season ever, including another College World Series trip. Anderson could not sustain this, however; since his departure in 2011 Nebraska has experienced modest success under head coaches Darin Erstad and Will Bolt.

Nebraska has been to the NCAA Division I Baseball Championship seventeen times and advanced to three College World Series. The Cornhuskers have won eight regular season conference championships and four conference tournament championships. Sixteen Huskers have been named First-Team All-Americans and Alex Gordon won the 2005 Golden Spikes Award as the best amateur baseball player in the country.

Season-by-season results

Notes

References

External links

 
Nebraska
Nebraska Cornhuskers baseball seasons